Coleophora talynella is a moth of the family Coleophoridae that occurs in Mongolia.

References

talynella
Moths of Asia